Sun So-eun (also Seon Su-eun, ; born July 1, 1988) is a South Korean former swimmer, who specialized in freestyle events. She won a total of two bronze medals, as a member of the South Korean team, in the 4×100 m freestyle (3:44.81) and 4×100 m medley relay (4:13.41) at the 2002 Asian Games in Busan.

Sun teamed up with Ryu Yoon-ji, Shim Min-ji, and Kim Hyun-joo in the 4×100 m freestyle relay at the 2004 Summer Olympics in Athens. Swimming the lead-off leg, Sun recorded a split of 56.86, but the South Koreans missed the final by two seconds outside the top 8, in a time of 3:44.84.

References

1988 births
Living people
Olympic swimmers of South Korea
Swimmers at the 2002 Asian Games
Asian Games medalists in swimming
South Korean female freestyle swimmers
Swimmers from Seoul
Asian Games bronze medalists for South Korea
Medalists at the 2002 Asian Games
Swimmers at the 2004 Summer Olympics
21st-century South Korean women